Tyulgansky District is an administrative and municipal district (raion), one of the thirty-five in Orenburg Oblast, Russia. Its administrative center is the rural locality (a settlement) of Tyulgan. As of the 2010 Census, the total population of the district was 19,725, with the population of Tyulgan accounting for 45.4% of that number.

Geography

References

Notes

Sources 
 
 
 

Districts of Orenburg Oblast